Ibliss were a progressiveKrautrockjazz fusion band from the Rhineland in Germany. Founded as a quintet in 1971 by former members of Kraftwerk and its predecessor Organisation, they recorded one album in Hamburg—with notable Krautrock producer Conny Plank. The group disbanded in 1973.

Members
Andreas Homann (drums, percussion)
Basil Hammoudi (percussion, flute, vocals)
Norbert Buellmeyer (bass guitar, percussion)
Rainer Buechel (saxophone, flute)
Wolfgang Buellmeyer (guitar, percussion)

Discography
Supernova (1972 LP)

References

German musical groups
Krautrock musical groups
Musical groups established in 1971
1971 establishments in Germany